"Running Back" is a song by American rock singer Eddie Money, from his album Playing for Keeps in 1980. It was released as a single and reached #78 on the Billboard Hot 100.

Eddie Money songs
1980 singles
1980 songs
Columbia Records singles